Hazel Mae Clark (born October 3, 1977) is an American middle-distance runner who specializes in the 800 meters middle distance race. She was a member of the U.S. Olympic team in 2000, 2004 and 2008. She has won six national titles and two USA Olympic Trials events during her career.

Early life and education
Clark was born in Livingston, New Jersey.  She is the daughter of inner-city educator Joe Louis Clark, who inspired the film Lean on Me, and the sister-in-law of fellow Olympian Jearl Miles-Clark.  Joetta Clark Diggs is her older sister. Hazel Clark, her sister, and her sister-in-law made history when they swept the 2000 Olympic trials 800 meters.

Clark attended Columbia High School.  She accepted an athletic scholarship to attend the University of Florida in Gainesville, Florida, where she was a member of the Florida Gators track and field team and was coached by her brother J.J.  While at Florida, she was undefeated in SEC competition and won five NCAA titles.  Clark graduated from the University of Florida with a bachelor's degree in sociology in 2001. She was honored for her college athletic record when she was inducted into the University of Florida Athletic Hall of Fame as a "Gator Great" in 2012.

Career

Clark finished seventh at the 2000 Olympic Games.  At the 2001 World Championships, she did not progress past the first round due to injury.  In 2001, she was given a warning for using pseudoephedrine.

At the 2004 Olympics, Clark was eliminated from her first-round heat in the 800 meters after a freak accident where she was burned severely.  She then had two good seasons with an eighth place at the 2005 World Championships, seventh place at the 2005 and 2006 World Athletics Final, and a sixth place at the 2006 World Cup.

In 2008, she won her second U.S. Olympic Trials 800 meters final held in Eugene, Oregon, and competed at the 2008 Summer Olympics.
Her personal best time is 1:57.99 minutes, achieved in July 2005 at the Bislett Games in Oslo.

Clark has appeared in three global Nike ads appearing in fashion magazines, stores, and billboards.  She has been marketed by Nike as a spokesmodel throughout her career.

She is currently the Director of Global Sales for the Bermuda Tourism Authority.

Personal life
Her ex-husband, Wenston Riley, proposed to her on national television in 2004. They divorced in 2014 and she is now married to Bermudian Shane Mcilwain.

See also 

 Florida Gators
 List of University of Florida alumni
 List of University of Florida Athletic Hall of Fame members
 List of University of Florida Olympians

References

External links 

 
 USA Track & Field: Hazel Clark

1977 births
Living people
American female middle-distance runners
Athletes (track and field) at the 2000 Summer Olympics
Athletes (track and field) at the 2003 Pan American Games
Athletes (track and field) at the 2004 Summer Olympics
Athletes (track and field) at the 2008 Summer Olympics
Doping cases in athletics
Florida Gators women's track and field athletes
Olympic track and field athletes of the United States
People from Livingston, New Jersey
Sportspeople from Essex County, New Jersey
Track and field athletes from New Jersey
Pan American Games track and field athletes for the United States